Oceania is the geographical region comprising the Pacific Islands of Micronesia, Melanesia, Polynesia and Australia.

Oceania may also refer to:
 One of the fictional nations of Nineteen Eighty-Four, in George Orwell's novel, Nineteen Eighty-Four
 Oceania Cooperative Union, one of the fictional supranational blocs in Front Mission
 Oceania (journal), an Australian academic publication founded in 1930
 Oceanía metro station, a station on the Mexico City Metro Lines 5 and B
 Deportivo Oceanía metro station, a station on the Mexico City Metro Line B
 Oceania (board game), a board game for one or two players
 French Oceania, the English translation of Océanie française, the name used for French Polynesia from 1842 until 1957

Music
Oceania (Oceania album) (1999), Jaz Coleman and Hinewehi Mohi album, which achieved double platinum sales in New Zealand
 Oceania (The Smashing Pumpkins album) (2012)
 Oceania (Goanna album) (1985)
 "Oceania", a song by Gowan from his eponymous 1982 album
 "Oceania", a song by Pat Metheny Group from the album Quartet
 "Oceania" (song), a song by Björk, from her album Medúlla, performed at the opening ceremony of the 2004 Summer Olympics

Ships
 Oceania Cruises, a U.S.-based luxury cruise line
 MS Oceania, an Italian Line passenger ship, built 1932, sunk 1941
 RV Oceania, a tall ship and research vessel owned by the Polish Academy of Sciences

See also
 Oceana (disambiguation)
 Ocean (disambiguation)
 Australia (disambiguation)